The Rio Grande Trail is a proposed long distance trail along the Rio Grande in the U.S. state of New Mexico. It is the state's primary drainage feature and most valuable natural and cultural resource. The river and its bosque provide a wide variety of recreation, including hunting and fishing, birdwatching, river rafting, hiking, biking, and horseback riding. The river also flows through or beside numerous spectacular and geologically interesting landforms, the result of extensive volcanism and erosion of the valley within the Rio Grande Rift. Although some trail advocates would like to see the trail extended the full distance through New Mexico, from the Colorado border to the United States–Mexico border, the portion proposed for initial development extends , from Bernalillo south to Las Cruces.

History
Governor Bill Richardson and New Mexico State Parks proposed the establishment of this trail.  In 2006 the New Mexico Legislature provided funding to begin planning and development of the project. In April 2015, the Rio Grande Trail bill was signed by Gov. Susana Martinez, which creates a commission composed of state and local governments, activists, and local pueblos and tribes.

The core of the proposed trail is the existing Paseo del Bosque Trail in Albuquerque, a product of long-standing collaboration among numerous interest groups and agencies including the Middle Rio Grande Conservancy District, which also maintains ditchbank trails in Corrales and other communities in the area.

In October, 2016 Las Cruces designated part of its existing recreational trail system as part of the Rio Grande Trail.
http://www.lcsun-news.com/story/news/local/las-cruces/2016/10/20/la-llorona-becomes-latest-segment-rio-grande-trail/92482970/

Proposed trail corridor
In many locations the basic infrastructure already exists in the form of either designated trails or informal trails.  Informal trails exist on ditchbanks of local acequias and irrigation districts, on abandoned rights-of-way of old railroads, and on some publicly owned land.  Most notable of these are the  Paseo del Bosque Trail, and the abandoned right-of-way of the Chili Line of the Denver and Rio Grande Western Railroad (San Luis Valley Route).  Spur trails also exist, both designated trails and informal trails as above plus tributary arroyos.

The Paseo del Bosque Trail is the nucleus of the proposed trail. In 2005, New Mexico State Parks committed $3 million to MRCOG to develop this plan. In 2006, New Mexico State Parks determined its next priority to be the segment from Belen south to Las Cruces. This was determined in part due to the potential for synergy with established state parks and ongoing trail development projects. For planning purposes, the  trail corridor from Bernalillo south to Las Cruces was divided into six sections:  MRCOG Bosque, Sevilleta Corridor, BLM Socorro Bosque, Camino Real Corridor, Elephant Butte Corridor, and Southern State Parks Corridor. A map of the trail corridor segments and trail progress has been made available by the New Mexico State Parks Division. In 2007, under the federal Recreational Trails Program, New Mexico State Parks awarded $474,698 to Elephant Butte Lake State Park for a 10.5 mi section designated as West Lakeshore Trail. Meanwhile, as community trail development activities grew north of Bernalillo, especially in and north of the Santa Fe area, NMSP awarded $80,000 to the Santa Fe National Forest for a developed trailhead near Santa Fe on the Caja del Rio.

North of Bernalillo to NM 502 (connecting Pojoaque and Los Alamos), the Rio Grande passes through several pueblos and White Rock Canyon.  This presents several kinds of obstacles to trail development.  In particular, the lake behind Cochiti Dam backs into White Rock Canyon.

List of features

Features of the proposed trail corridor are listed in order from north to south. Bridges across the Rio Grande (listed separately) are candidate locations for trailheads.

Rio Arriba County, New Mexico
Earthships

Rio Grande Gorge
Orilla Verde Recreation Area
Embudo Station
Lyden, New Mexico
Ohkay Owingeh (formerly San Juan Pueblo)
Española, New Mexico
Old Spanish Trail (trade route)
Santa Fe County, New Mexico

Santa Clara Pueblo
San Ildefonso Pueblo
Pajarito Plateau
White Rock Canyon
Bandelier National Monument
Caja del Rio
Sandoval County, New Mexico
Santo Domingo Pueblo

Kasha-Katuwe Tent Rocks National Monument

Cochiti Lake
Cochiti Pueblo
Bernalillo County, New Mexico

San Felipe Pueblo
Bernalillo
Rio Rancho Bosque
Paseo del Bosque Trail
Albuquerque
Isleta Pueblo
Los Lunas
Belen
Bosque
Bernardo
Escondida
Socorro County
Sevilleta National Wildlife Refuge
San Lorenzo Canyon Recreation Area
San Antonio
Bosque del Apache National Wildlife Refuge
Socorro
Trinity (nuclear test)
Sierra County
Elephant Butte Lake
Truth or Consequences
Caballo Lake
Derry and Arrey
Salem
Doña Ana County
Hatch
Rincon
Radium Springs, New Mexico
Fort Selden
Jornada del Muerto
Doña Ana, New Mexico
Las Cruces, New Mexico

Organ Mountains
Mesilla Valley Bosque State Park
Mesilla, New Mexico
Mesquite, New Mexico
Vado, New Mexico and La Mesa, New Mexico
Berino, New Mexico
Anthony, New Mexico
Sunland Park, New Mexico and El Paso, Texas
Potrillo volcanic field
United States–Mexico border

See also
El Camino Real de Tierra Adentro
Santa Fe River Trail
Santa Fe Trail
Grand Enchantment Trail

External links
New Mexico State Parks Rio Grande Trail Corridor Study
Mid-Region Council of Governments of New Mexico: Rio Grande Trail: Extension Project: Belen to Bernalillo

References

Hiking trails in New Mexico
Rail trails in New Mexico